John Steiner (7 January 1941 – 31 July 2022) was an English actor. Tall, thin and gaunt, he attended the Royal Academy of Dramatic Art and performed on-stage for the Royal Shakespeare Company, but was best known to audiences for his roles in Italian films, several of which became cult classics.

Early life and acting career 
Steiner was born in Chester, Cheshire on January 7, 1941. He attended the Royal Academy of Dramatic Art and joined the Royal Shakespeare Company. He acted in the role of Monsieur Dupere in Peter Brook's production of Marat/Sade. He reprised the role when the play was transferred to Broadway, and again for the 1967 film adaptation.

He found work primarily in films including and the original Bedazzled (1967) with Peter Cook and Dudley Moore. In 1969, Steiner was hired to play a part in the Spaghetti Western Tepepa, and also appeared opposite Franco Nero in White Fang, directed by Lucio Fulci. In 1971 he starred in the television series Hine. In 1979 he featured in the leading role of Leo in a television production of Design for Living by Noël Coward.

He found himself in demand in Italy and moved there, appearing in a great number of Italian exploitation and B-films including police actioners (Violent Rome), westerns (Mannaja), war films (The Last Hunter), nazisploitation (Deported Women of the SS Special Section), sci-fi adventure films (Yor, the Hunter from the Future), and horror films, such as Mario Bava's Shock, Dario Argento's Tenebrae, and Ruggero Deodato's Body Count. He also became a favourite of famed Italian filmmaker Tinto Brass, featuring in Salon Kitty, the infamous Caligula, Action, and Paprika. He remained in steady demand until the late 1980s.

Retirement and later life 
As the Italian film industry dwindled, Steiner retired from acting in 1991 and moved to California, where he became a successful real estate agent. Steiner later contributed to DVD extras on some of his films and gave interviews about his Italian work.

Personal life
Steiner was bisexual. During the 1960s he was in a long-term relationship with director John Schlesinger and became the basis for the character Bob Elkin (played by Murray Head) in Schlesinger's semi-autobiographical film Sunday Bloody Sunday.

He later married, and is survived by his wife of over 30 years  

In addition to English, Steiner spoke French, Italian, and German.

Death 
Steiner died in a car crash in La Quinta, California, on 31 July 2022, at the age of 81.

Selected filmography

Marat/Sade (1967) – Monsieur Dupere
Bedazzled (1967) – TV Announcer (uncredited)
Work Is a Four-Letter Word (1968) – Anthony
Tepepa (1969) – Doctor Henry Price
The Thirteen Chairs (1969) – Stanley Duncan
 El bosque del lobo (1970) – Robert
A Girl Called Jules (1970) – Luciano
May Morning (1970) – Roderick Stanton
L'asino d'oro: processo per fatti strani contro Lucius Apuleius cittadino romano (1970) – Aristomene
Bali (1970) – Arthur Glenn
The Case Is Closed, Forget It (1971) – Biro
Slap the Monster on Page One (1972) – Ingegner Montelli
The Police Serve the Citizens? (1973) – Lambro
Massacre in Rome (1973) – Col. Dollmann
Black Holiday (1973) – Scagnetti
White Fang (1973) – Charles 'Beauty' Smith
Morel's Invention (1974) – Morel
Challenge to White Fang (1974) – Beauty Smith / Charles Forth
The Last Day of School Before Christmas (1975) – Il Tenente
I Don't Want to Be Born (1975) – Tommy Morris
Waves of Lust (1975) – Giorgio / Husband
Violent Rome (1975) – Franco Spadoni 'Chiodo'
Dracula in the Provinces (1975) – Count Dragulescu
Salon Kitty (1976) – Biondo
Le guêpier (1976) – Fisher
Mark Strikes Again (1976) – Paul Henkel
Deported Women of the SS Special Section (1976) – Herr Erner
Bloody Payroll (1976) – Fausto
Plot of Fear (1976) – Hoffmann
Von Buttiglione Sturmtruppenführer (1977) – Schwein
Shock (1977) – Bruno Baldini
Mannaja (1977) – Valler
The Criminals Attack, The Police Respond (1977) – Rufy
Gangbuster (1977) – Killer
Antonio Gramsci: The Days of Prison (1977) – Laurin
Goodbye & Amen (1978) – Donald Grayson
L'Amour en question (1978) – Tom Hastings
Caligula (1979) – Longinus
Action (1980) – The Manager
The Last Hunter (1980) – Major William Cash
Car Crash (1981) – Kirby
The Salamander (1981) – Captain Roditi
Hunters of the Golden Cobra (1982) – Captain David Franks
Tenebrae (1982) – Christiano Berti
Yor, the Hunter from the Future (1983) – Overlord
Dagger Eyes (1983) – Ivanov
The Ark of the Sun God (1984) – Lord Dean
I due carabinieri (1984) – Crazy Man on Train
A.D. (1985, TV Mini-Series) – Simon the Magus
Cut and Run (1985) – Vlado
Commando Leopard (1985) – Smithy
The Berlin Affair (1985) – Oskar Engelhart
Troppo forte (1985) – Mr. Adams
Operation Nam (1986) – James Walcott
Body Count (1986) – Dr. Olsen
Summer Night (1986) – Frederick, Fulvia's lover
Lone Runner (1986) – Skorm
Julia and Julia (1987) – Alex
Night of the Sharks (1988) – Rosentski
 (1988) – Duclaud
Striker (1988) – Kariasin
Appointment in Liverpool (1988)
Sinbad of the Seven Seas (1989) – Jaffar
Massacre Play (1989) – Danilo
Paprika (1991) – Principe Ascanio (final film role)

References

External links
 
 
 Biography for John Steiner (in French)
 His own website

1941 births
2022 deaths
English male television actors
Male Spaghetti Western actors
English male film actors
Actors from Chester
Male actors from Cheshire
English expatriates
British estate agents (people)
Alumni of RADA
Road incident deaths in California
British expatriates in Italy
British expatriates in the United States
English male stage actors
Royal Shakespeare Company members